A job guarantee is an economic policy proposal that aims to provide a sustainable solution to inflation and unemployment. Its aim is to create full employment and price stability by having the state promise to hire unemployed workers as an employer of last resort (ELR).

The economic policy stance currently dominant around the world uses unemployment as a policy tool to control inflation. When inflation rises, the government pursues contractionary fiscal or monetary policy, with the aim of creating a buffer stock of unemployed people, reducing wage demands, and ultimately inflation. When inflationary expectations subside, expansionary policy aims to produce the opposite effect.

By contrast, in a job guarantee program, a buffer stock of employed people (employed in the job guarantee program) is typically intended to provide the same protection against inflation without the social costs of unemployment, hence potentially fulfilling the dual mandate of full employment and price stability.

Overview 
A job guarantee is based on a buffer stock principle whereby the public sector offers a fixed wage job to anyone willing and able to work thereby establishing and maintaining a buffer stock of employed workers. This buffer stock expands when private sector activity declines, and declines when private sector activity expands, much like today's unemployed buffer stocks.

A job guarantee thus fulfills an absorption function to minimize the real costs associated with the flux of the private sector. When private sector employment declines, public sector employment will automatically react and increase its payrolls. So in a recession, the increase in public employment will increase net government spending, and stimulate aggregate demand and the economy. Conversely, in a boom, the decline of public sector employment and spending caused by workers leaving their job guarantee jobs for higher paid private sector employment will lessen stimulation, so the job guarantee functions as an automatic stabilizer controlling inflation. The nation always remains fully employed, with a changing mix between private and public sector employment. Since the job guarantee wage is open to everyone, it will functionally become the national minimum wage.

Under a job guarantee, people of working age who are not in full-time education and have less than 35 hours per week of paid employment would be entitled to the balance of 35 hours paid employment, undertaking work of public benefit at the minimum wage, though specifics may change depending on the model. The aim is to replace unemployment and underemployment with paid employment (up to the hours desired by workers), so that those who are at any point in time surplus to the requirements of the private sector (and mainstream public sector) can earn a wage rather than be underemployed or suffer poverty and social exclusion.

A range of income support arrangements, including a generic work-tested benefit payment, could also be available to unemployed people, depending on their circumstances, as an initial subsistence income while arrangements are made to employ them.

Job guarantee theory is often associated with certain post-Keynesian economists, particularly at the Centre of Full Employment and Equity (University of Newcastle, Australia), at the Levy Economics Institute (Bard College), and at University of Missouri – Kansas City including the affiliated Center for Full Employment and Price Stability.

One theory was put forward by Hyman Minsky in 1965. Notable job guarantee theories were conceived independently by Bill Mitchell (1998), and Warren Mosler (1997–98). This work was then developed further by L. Randall Wray (1998). A comprehensive treatment of it appears in Mitchell and Muysken (2008).

Inflation control 

A fixed job guarantee wage provides an in-built inflation control mechanism. Mitchell (1998) called the ratio of job guarantee employment to total employment the buffer employment ratio (BER). The BER conditions the overall rate of wage demands. When the BER is high, real wage demands will be correspondingly lower. If inflation exceeds the government's announced target, tighter fiscal and monetary policy would be triggered to increase the BER, which entails workers transferring from the inflating sector to the fixed price job guarantee sector. Ultimately this attenuates the inflation spiral. So instead of a buffer stock of unemployed being used to discipline the distributional struggle, a job guarantee policy achieves this via compositional shifts in employment.

Replacing the currently widely-used measure the non-accelerating inflation rate of unemployment (NAIRU), the BER that results in stable inflation is called the non-accelerating inflation buffer employment ratio (NAIBER). It is a full employment steady state job guarantee level, which is dependent on a range of factors including the path of the economy. There is an issue about the validity of an unchanging nominal anchor in an inflationary environment. A job guarantee wage would be adjusted in line with productivity growth to avoid changing real relativities. Its viability as a nominal anchor relies on the fiscal authorities reining in any private wage-price pressures.

No relative wage effects 
Mitchell and Muysken believe that a job guarantee introduces no relative wage effects and the rising demand does not necessarily invoke inflationary pressures because it is, by definition, satisfying the net savings desire of the private sector. Additionally, in today's demand constrained economies, firms are likely to increase capacity utilisation to meet the higher sales volumes. Given that the demand impulse is less than required in the NAIRU economy, if there were any demand-pull inflation it would be lower under a job guarantee. There are no new problems faced by employers who wish to hire labour to meet the higher sales levels. Any initial rise in demand will stimulate private sector employment growth while reducing job guarantee employment and spending. However, these demand pressures are unlikely to lead to accelerating inflation while the job guarantee pool contains workers employable by the private sector.

Wage bargaining 
While a job guarantee policy frees wage bargaining from the general threat of unemployment, several factors offset this:
 In professional occupational markets, any unemployment will generate downwards pressure on wages. However, eventually the stock of unemployed professionals will be exhausted, whereupon upward wage-price pressures can be expected to develop. With a strong and responsive tertiary education sector, skill bottlenecks can be avoided more readily than with an unemployed buffer stock;
 Private firms would still be required to train new workers in job-specific skills in the same way they would in a non-Job Guarantee economy. However, job guarantee workers are far more likely to have retained higher levels of skill than those who are forced to succumb to lengthy spells of unemployment. This changes the bargaining environment rather significantly because firms now have reduced hiring costs. Previously, the same firms would have lowered their hiring standards and provided on-the-job training and vestibule training in tight labour markets. A job guarantee policy thus reduces the "hysteretic inertia" embodied in the long-term unemployed and allows for a smoother private sector expansion;
 With high long-term unemployment, the excess supply of labour poses a very weak threat to wage bargaining, compared to a job guarantee environment.

List of job guarantee programs

Programs for adults 

 1848 – The first modern direct job creation scheme was implemented by the Parisian government in France through the National Workshops which took place from February to June 1848.
 1928–1991 – The Soviet Union guaranteed a job for nearly everyone from about 1928 (as part of the Great Break) through to its end in 1991. A job guarantee was included in its 1936 constitution, and was given further prominence in the 1977 revision. Later communist states followed this lead.
 1935–1943 – In the United States from 1935 to 1943, the Works Progress Administration aimed to ensure all families in the country had one paid job, though there was never a job guarantee. Full employment was achieved by 1942 due to World War II, which led to the ending of the organisation the following year.
 1945 – From 1945, the Australian government was committed to full employment through the position established by the White Paper on Full Employment in Australia, however this never included a formal job guarantee. The Reserve Bank Act 1959 charges the Reserve Bank of Australia with ensuring full employment, amongst other duties.
 1946 – The original drafters of the US Employment Act of 1946 intended for it to mandate full employment, however Congress ultimately gave it a broader pro-employment nature.
 1948 – The UN's Universal Declaration of Human Rights' Article 23 includes "Everyone has the right to work, to free choice of employment, to just and favourable conditions of work and to protection against unemployment." It is ratified by most non-socialist countries.
 1949-1997 – In the People's Republic of China from 1949 to 1997, the "iron rice bowl" practiced guaranteed employment for its citizens.
 1978 – The US Humphrey-Hawkins Full Employment Act of 1978 authorized the government to create a "reservoir of public employment" in case private enterprise does not provide sufficient jobs. These jobs are required to be in the lower ranges of skill and pay so as to not draw the workforce away from the private sector. However, the act did not establish such a reservoir (it only authorized it), and no such program has been implemented, even though the unemployment rate has generally been above the rate (3%) targeted by the act.
 1998 – Australia implements its national Work for the Dole scheme, requiring able-bodied people to do some form of work or study in order to get unemployment payments. The work involved is typically provided by charities, and sometimes by government agencies. The scheme would later be expanded to include commercial farms (Drought Force).
 1998–2010 – The United Kingdom's New Deal was similar to Australia's Work for the Dole scheme, though more focused on young people. It was in place from 1998 to 2010.
 2001 – The Argentine government introduced the Jefes de Hogar (Heads of Households) program in 2001 to combat the social malaise that followed the financial crisis in that year.
 2005 – Similarly, the government of India in 2005 introduced a five-year plan called the National Rural Employment Guarantee Act (NREGA) to bridge the vast rural–urban income disparities that have emerged as India's information technology sector has boomed. The program successfully empowered women and raised rural wages, but also attracted the ire of landowners who have to pay farm labourers more due to a higher prevailing wage. NREGA projects tend to be highly labour-intensive and low skill, like dam and road construction, and soil conservation, with modest but positive long-term benefits and mediocre management.
 2012 – The South African government introduced the Expanded Public Works Program (EPWP) in 2012 to overcome the extremely high unemployment and accompanying poverty in that country. EPWP projects employ workers with government, contractors, or other non-governmental organisations under the Ministerial Conditions of Employment for the EPWP or learnership employment conditions.
 2020 – The Labour Exchange in the district of Gramatneusiedl in Austria introduced a job guarantee that kicks in when somebody has been without a paid job for more than nine months. When a job seeker is placed with a private company, the Labour Exchange pays 100% of the wage for the first three months, and 66% during the subsequent nine months. Though most of the long-term jobless were placed in non-profit training companies tasked with repairing second-hand furniture, renovating housing and similar jobs, the overwhelming majority of the affected people reported improvements, notably in the areas of psychological well-being and maintaining social contacts. Gramatneusiedl is the location of the Marienthal textile works which closed in 1930, leading to massive unemployment in the community. The sociological studies in the wake of the Marienthal closure, led by Hans Zeisel, Paul Lazarsfeld and Marie Jahoda, received international acclaim.

Programs for youth

 The European Youth Guarantee is a commitment by European Union member states to "guarantee that all young people under the age of 25 receive, within four months of becoming unemployed or leaving formal education, a good quality work offer to match their skills and experience; or the chance to continue their studies or undertake an apprenticeship or professional traineeship." The committed countries agreed to start implementing this in 2014. Since 2014, each year more than 3.5 million young people registered in the program accepted an offer of employment, continued education, a traineeship or an apprenticeship. Correspondingly, youth unemployment in the EU has decreased from a peak of 24% in 2013 to 14% in 2019.
 Sweden first implemented a similar guarantee in 1984, with fellow Nordic countries Norway (1993), Denmark (1996) and Finland (1996) following. Later, some additional European countries also offered this as well, prior to the EU wide adoption.
 Germany and many Nordic countries have long had civil and military conscription programs for young people, which requires or gives them the option to do low-paid work for a government body for up to 12 months. This was also the case in the Netherlands until 1997. It was also the case in France, and that country is reintroducing a similar program from 2021.

Advocacy 
The Labour Party under Ed Miliband went into the 2015 UK general election with a promise to implement a limited job guarantee (specifically, part-time jobs with guaranteed training included for long-term unemployed youth) if elected; however, they lost the election.

Bernie Sanders supports a federal jobs guarantee for the United States and Alexandria Ocasio-Cortez included a jobs-guarantee program as one of her campaign pledges when she ran for, and won, her seat in the U.S. House of Representatives in 2018.

See also 

 Centre of Full Employment and Equity
 Chartalism
 Full Employment Abandoned
 Flexicurity
 Guaranteed minimum income
 Involuntary unemployment
 Job security
 Modern Monetary Theory
 National Rural Employment Guarantee Act
 Natural rate of unemployment
 Non-accelerating inflation buffer employment ratio
 Kurzarbeit

Footnotes

References

Further reading

External links
 Expanded Public Works Program of South Africa
 Job Guarantee: Introduction to and history of the concept

Economic policy
Post-Keynesian economics
Public employment
Full employment
Right to work
Work relief programs